The Wiehen Hills (also locally, just Wiehen) are a hill range in North Rhine-Westphalia and Lower Saxony in Germany. The hills run from west to east like a long finger away from the main upland area of the Lower Saxon Hills, beginning at the Weser River near Minden and terminating in the vicinity of Osnabrück.
It is the northernmost of the German Central Upland ranges extending into the Northern Lowlands.

Location 
The Wiehen Hills lie within the districts of Osnabrück, Minden-Lübbecke and Herford. Their northern section runs in an east-west direction roughly from the territory of Bramsche (northwest of  Osnabrück) via Ostercappeln, Bad Essen, Preußisch Oldendorf and Rödinghausen, Lübbecke, Hüllhorst and Bad Oeynhausen as far as the towns of Minden and Porta Westfalica on the Porta Westfalica gorge and River Weser. They also graze Bohmte and Hille to the north. South of the Wiehen Hills lie Osnabrück, Bissendorf, Melle, Kirchlengern, Bünde, Löhne and Bad Oeynhausen.
The Wiehen Hills form the northwestern boundary of the Lower Saxon Hills to which they belong geographically, together with the Westphalian part of the ridge.
Whilst the eastern end of the hill chain is clearly defined by the Porta Westfalica gorge and the hill of Wittekindsberg, this is not so simple for its western extremity. To the west the Wiehen descends gradually, transitioning from a hilly ridge into a chain of hillocks and then descending almost imperceptibly into the plain. South of Bramsche the ridge rises again at the Penter Egge to a height of 99 metre, but 2.5 km further west it reaches the level of the surrounding countryside. The waterways of the Mittelland Canal and Osnabrück Canal running away to the south appear to mark the end of the hill range, but west of these canals is the 82-metre-high Larberger Egge which forms the westernmost cornerstone of the Wiehen Hills, rising just 2  km northeast of the boundary with the province of Münster. Contrary to popular assumption, Ibbenbüren is no longer considered to be situated by the Wiehen Hills and the Ibbenbüren Plateau (Ibbenbürener Bergplatte comprising the Schafberg, etc.) is no longer part of the Wiehen. Geological reasons, according to current research, do not support such an assumption.

To the north, the Wiehen descends to the North German Plain into a region known as the Lübbecke Loessland. On the banks of the Weser, opposite Porta Westfalica, lies the Wesergebirge, which is the eastern continuation of the Wiehen Hills. This ridge is of similar geological construction and runs as far as the area of Hessisch Oldendorf to the Süntel hills. Southeast of the Wiehen Hills are the Lippe Uplands, to the south the Ravensberg Hills, to the southwest in the area of the Tecklenburg Land are the northern foothills of the Teutoburg Forest, and to the northwest are the hills of the Gehn and the Ankum Heights, the Damme Hills and the Stemweder Berg. North of the northwestern tip of the Wiehen liest the great bog of the Großes Moor.

Hills 

The hills of the Wiehen range from west to east are:

Height of the highest hill in bold; heights in metres (m) above Normalhöhennull (NHN)

Northernmost German uplands 
According to folklore, regionally conscious residents around the hills usually admit grudgingly that the Wiehen Hills are not particularly high. In the same breath, they may assert, often with a raised index finger and an odd emphasis on the word gebirge ("hill/mountain range"), that they are the northernmost hill range in Germany and the one closest to the sea.
Whether this assertion is true is in fact a matter of definition. It clearly ignores the morainic ridges further north and closer to the sea, as well as other true uplands such as the Stemweder Berg or the Rehburg Hills. Of course, these hills are much lower and do not reach the 200-metre contour line.
Of the higher, say up to  uplands, the northern foothills of Deister and Bückeberge extend farther north than the eastern Wiehen range. However, it is also true that the highest part of the Wiehen Hills at Lübbecke has the most northerly hill over 300 metres in Germany. The Heidbrink, at almost 320 metres high, is also the northernmost "three-hundred" on the European continent between the central Ural Mountains and the Atlantic, i.e. excluding the British Isles and Fennoscandinavia.

References 

 
Hill ranges of Germany
Mountains and hills of North Rhine-Westphalia
Landforms of Lower Saxony
Lübbecke
Preußisch Oldendorf